Filariasis is a parasitic disease caused by an infection with roundworms of the Filarioidea type. These are spread by blood-feeding insects such as black flies and mosquitoes. They belong to the group of diseases called helminthiases.

These parasites exist in the wild in subtropical parts of southern Asia, Africa, the South Pacific, and parts of South America. One does not acquire them in temperate areas like Europe or the United States.

Eight known filarial worms have humans as a definitive host. These are divided into three groups according to the part of the body they affect:
 Lymphatic filariasis is caused by the worms Wuchereria bancrofti, Brugia malayi, and Brugia timori. These worms occupy the lymphatic system, including the lymph nodes; in chronic cases, these worms lead to the syndrome of elephantiasis.
 Subcutaneous filariasis is caused by Loa loa (the eye worm), Mansonella streptocerca, and Onchocerca volvulus. These worms occupy the layer just under the skin. L. loa causes Loa loa filariasis, while O. volvulus causes river blindness.
 Serous cavity filariasis is caused by the worms Mansonella perstans and Mansonella ozzardi, which occupy the serous cavity of the abdomen. Dirofilaria immitis, the dog heartworm, rarely infects humans.

The adult worms, which usually stay in one tissue, release early larval forms known as microfilariae into the person's blood. These circulating microfilariae can be taken up during a blood meal by an insect vector; in the vector, they develop into infective larvae that can be spread to another person.

Individuals infected by filarial worms may be described as either "microfilaraemic" or "amicrofilaraemic", depending on whether microfilariae can be found in their peripheral blood. Filariasis is diagnosed in microfilaraemic cases primarily through direct observation of microfilariae in the peripheral blood. Occult filariasis is diagnosed in amicrofilaraemic cases based on clinical observations and, in some cases, by finding a circulating antigen in the blood.

Signs and symptoms

The most spectacular symptom of lymphatic filariasis is elephantiasis – edema with thickening of the skin and underlying tissues—which was the first disease discovered to be transmitted by mosquito bites. Elephantiasis results when the parasites lodge in the lymphatic system.

Elephantiasis affects mainly the lower extremities, while the ears, mucous membranes, and amputation stumps are affected less frequently. However, different species of filarial worms tend to affect different parts of the body; Wuchereria bancrofti can affect the legs, arms, vulva, breasts, and scrotum (causing hydrocele formation), while Brugia timori rarely affects the genitals. Those who develop the chronic stages of elephantiasis are usually free from microfilariae (amicrofilaraemic), and often have adverse immunological reactions to the microfilariae, as well as the adult worms.

The subcutaneous worms present with rashes, urticarial papules, and arthritis, as well as hyper- and hypopigmentation macules. Onchocerca volvulus manifests itself in the eyes, causing "river blindness" (onchocerciasis), one of the leading causes of blindness in the world. Serous cavity filariasis presents with symptoms similar to subcutaneous filariasis, in addition to abdominal pain, because these worms are also deep-tissue dwellers.

Cause
Human filarial nematode worms have complicated life cycles, which primarily consists of five stages. After the male and female worms mate, the female gives birth to live microfilariae by the thousands. The microfilariae are taken up by the vector insect (intermediate host) during a blood meal. In the intermediate host, the microfilariae molt and develop into third-stage (infective) larvae. Upon taking another blood meal, the vector insect, such as Culex pipiens, injects the infectious larvae into the dermis layer of the skin. After about one year, the larvae molt through two more stages, maturing into the adult worms.

Diagnosis

Filariasis is usually diagnosed by identifying microfilariae on Giemsa stained, thin and thick blood film smears, using the "gold standard" known as the finger prick test. The finger prick test draws blood from the capillaries of the finger tip; larger veins can be used for blood extraction, but strict windows of the time of day must be observed. Blood must be drawn at appropriate times, which reflect the feeding activities of the vector insects. Examples are W. bancrofti, whose vector is a mosquito; night is the preferred time for blood collection. Loa loa's vector is the deer fly; daytime collection is preferred. This method of diagnosis is only relevant to microfilariae that use the blood as transport from the lungs to the skin. Some filarial worms, such as M. streptocerca and O. volvulus, produce microfilariae that do not use the blood; they reside in the skin only. For these worms, diagnosis relies upon skin snips and can be carried out at any time.

Concentration methods 
Various concentration methods are applied: membrane filter, Knott's concentration method, and sedimentation technique.

Polymerase chain reaction (PCR) and antigenic assays, which detect circulating filarial antigens, are also available for making the diagnosis. The latter are particularly useful in amicrofilaraemic cases. Spot tests for antigen are far more sensitive, and allow the test to be done anytime, rather in the late hours.

Lymph node aspirate and chylous fluid may also yield microfilariae.  Medical imaging, such as CT or MRI, may reveal "filarial dance sign" in the chylous fluid; X-ray tests can show calcified adult worms in lymphatics. The DEC provocation test is performed to obtain satisfying numbers of parasites in daytime samples. Xenodiagnosis is now obsolete, and eosinophilia is a nonspecific primary sign.

Treatment
The recommended treatment for people outside the United States is albendazole combined with ivermectin. A combination of diethylcarbamazine and albendazole is also effective. Side effects of the drugs include nausea, vomiting, and headaches. All of these treatments are microfilaricides; they have no effect on the adult worms. While the drugs are critical for treatment of the individual, proper hygiene is also required. There is good evidence that albendazole alone; or addition of albendazole to diethylcarbamazine or ivermectin, makes minimal difference in clearing microfilaria or adult worms from blood circulation. Diethylcarbamazine-medicated salt is effective in controlling lymphatic filariasis while maintaining its coverage at 90% in the community for six months.

Different trials were made to use the known drug at its maximum capacity in absence of new drugs. In a study from India, it was shown that a formulation of albendazole had better anti-filarial efficacy than albendazole itself.

In 2003, the common antibiotic doxycycline was suggested for treating elephantiasis. Filarial parasites have symbiotic bacteria in the genus Wolbachia, which live inside the worm and seem to play a major role in both its reproduction and the development of the disease. This drug has shown signs of inhibiting the reproduction of the bacteria, further inducing sterility.
Clinical trials in June 2005 by the Liverpool School of Tropical Medicine reported an eight-week course almost eliminated microfilaraemia.

Society and culture

Research teams 
In 2015 William C. Campbell and Satoshi Ōmura were co-awarded half of that year's Nobel prize in Physiology or Medicine for the discovery of the drug avermectin, which, in the further developed form ivermectin, has decreased the occurrence of lymphatic filariasis.

Prospects for elimination
Filarial diseases in humans offer prospects for elimination by means of vermicidal treatment. If the human link in the chain of infection can be broken, then notionally the disease could be wiped out in a season. In practice it is not quite so simple, and there are complications in that multiple species overlap in certain regions and double infections are common. This creates difficulties for routine mass treatment because people with onchocerciasis in particular react badly to treatment for lymphatic filariasis.

Other animals
Filariasis can also affect domesticated animals, such as cattle, sheep, and dogs.

Cattle
 Verminous hemorrhagic dermatitis is a clinical disease in cattle due to Parafilaria bovicola.
 Intradermal onchocerciasis of cattle results in losses in leather due to Onchocerca dermata, O. ochengi, and O. dukei. O. ochengi is closely related to human O. volvulus (river blindness), sharing the same vector, and could be useful in human medicine research.
 Stenofilaria assamensis and others cause different diseases in Asia, in cattle and zebu.

Horses
 "Summer bleeding" is hemorrhagic subcutaneous nodules in the head and upper forelimbs, caused by Parafilaria multipapillosa (North Africa, Southern and Eastern Europe, Asia and South America).

Dogs
 Heart filariasis is caused by Dirofilaria immitis.

See also 
 Ascariasis
 Eradication of infectious diseases
 Helminthiasis
 List of parasites (human)
 Neglected tropical diseases

References

Further reading

External links 

 Page from the "Merck Veterinary Manual" on "Parafilaria multipapillosa" in horses

Animal diseases
Insect-borne diseases
Helminthiases
Tropical diseases
Veterinary helminthology
Parasitic diseases